Limedale may refer to:

Limedale, Arkansas, an unincorporated community in Independence County
Limedale, Indiana, an unincorporated community in Putnam County